Sir Alexander Campbell Onslow (17 July 1842 – 20 October 1908) was the third Chief Justice of the Supreme Court of Western Australia, which is the highest ranking court in the Australian State of Western Australia.

Onslow is a forebear of the notable Australian Macarthur-Onslow families.

Biography 
Onslow was the fourth son of Arthur Pooley Onslow, of Send Grove, Ripley, Surrey, by his wife, Rosa Roberta, daughter of Alexander Macleay, F.R.S., Speaker of the first New South Wales Legislative Council. Onslow was educated at Westminster and Trinity College, Cambridge, where he graduated B.A. in 1864. He entered at the Inner Temple on 15 January 1862, was called to the bar on 17 November 1868, and went the Home Circuit. On 4 February 1878, he married Madeline Emma Loftus, daughter of Rev. Robert Loftus Tottenham, of Florence, and granddaughter of the Bishop of Clogher.

Onslow was Attorney-General of British Honduras from 1878 to 1880, and Attorney-General of Western Australia from 1880 to 1883. In July of the latter year he was appointed Chief Justice, in which capacity he administered the government during the absence of Sir Frederick Broome in England in 1884–5. Onslow's relations with that Governor having subsequently become strained, the latter threatened Onslow's security of tenure by "interdicting" him from his functions as Chief Justice, for the alleged premature and improper publication of certain correspondence then pending between them and with the Colonial Office. The Executive Council unanimously confirmed the interdict, and placed Mr. Onslow on half-pay pending the decision of the Colonial Office. In the result, Lord Knutsford reinstated Mr. Onslow, but censured him. Ultimately, in view of the attitude assumed by the Chief Justice in adjudicating on certain cases of newspaper libel, the Legislative Council passed a resolution requesting the Home Government, in the interests of tranquillity, to transfer him to some other location. He was accordingly given, a year's leave of absence but this was extended. In February 1890 it was announced that he was to exchange posts with Sir Elliot Bovill, Chief Justice of Cyprus. This arrangement did not actually take place and Sir Henry T. Wrensfordsley was sent out to the colony in 1890 as Acting Chief Justice.  Mr. Onslow returned to Western Australia and resumed his occupancy of the office of Chief Justice in July 1891. He was Administrator of Western Australia during the Governor's absence from March 1900.

He retired in 1901 and returned to England, where he died on 20 October 1908.

Onslow was knighted in 1895 for services rendered to the Queen's colonies since 1878.

Family
Father
 Arthur Pooley Onslow - father

Mother
 Rosa Roberta, née McLeay - mother
 Alexander McLeay (1767–1848) - Rosa Roberta's father
 Rosa Roberta's siblings
 William Sharp Macleay (1792–1865) He never married and the heir to his estate was his brother, George W. J. Macleay
 Sir George W. J. Macleay (1809–1891)
 James Robert (1811–1892) secretary of the commission for the suppression of the slave trade in Cape Colony.
 Margaret (b. 1802) married Archibald Clunes Innes (1800–1857) in 1829 
 Christiana Susan (b.1799) married Captain William Dumaresq (1793–1868) in 1830
 Barbara Isabella (b.1797) married Pieter Laurentz Campbell (1809–1948) in 1834.

Siblings
 Arthur Alexander Walton Onslow (1833–1882) - brother
 James Macarthur-Onslow - nephew

See also
 Judiciary of Australia
 James Macarthur-Onslow#Family

References

Further reading
 Braybrooke, E. K., 'Onslow, Sir Alexander Campbell (1842–1908)', Australian Dictionary of Biography, Volume 5, Melbourne University Press, 1974, pp 367–369.
 Black, David, and Bolton, Geoffrey (1990) Biographical register of members of the Parliament of Western Australia. Volume one. 1870-1930  assisted by Ann Mozley and Patricia Simpson. Perth W.A: Western Australian Parliamentary History Project. 
 biographical details West Australian, 27/5/1895,

1842 births
1908 deaths
Knights Bachelor
Australian people of Scottish descent
Chief Justices of Western Australia
Colony of Western Australia judges
Attorneys-General of Western Australia
British colonial attorneys general in Oceania
Attorneys-General of British Honduras
Alexander
Judges of the Supreme Court of Western Australia
19th-century Australian judges
20th-century Australian judges
Alumni of Trinity College, Cambridge
19th-century Australian politicians